115 (one hundred [and] fifteen) is the natural number following 114 and preceding 116.

In mathematics
115 has a square sum of divisors:

There are 115 different rooted trees with exactly eight nodes, 115 inequivalent ways of placing six rooks on a 6 × 6 chess board in such a way that no two of the rooks attack each other, and 115 solutions to the stamp folding problem for a strip of seven stamps.

115 is also a heptagonal pyramidal number. The 115th Woodall number,

is a prime number.
115 is the sum of the first five heptagonal numbers.

See also
 115 (disambiguation)

References

Integers